Sexual penetration is the insertion of a body part or other object into a body orifice, such as the mouth, vagina or anus, as part of human sexual activity or animal sexual behavior.

The term is most commonly used in statute law in the context of proscribing certain sexual activities.  Terms such as "sexual intercourse" or "carnal knowledge" are more commonly found in older statutes, while many modern criminal statutes use the term "sexual penetration" because it is a broad term encompassing (unless otherwise qualified) any form of penetrative sexual activity, including digital (i.e., the fingers) or with an object, and may involve only the most minimal penetration. Some jurisdictions refer to some forms of penetration as "acts of indecency", or other terminology.

Definitions
When a penis is inserted into a vagina, it is generally called vaginal sex, vaginal intercourse, or penis-in-vagina (PIV) sex. When a penis penetrates another person's anus, it is called anal sex or anal intercourse. 
Penetrative oral sex may involve penetration of the mouth by a penis (fellatio) or the use of the tongue to penetrate a vagina or vulva (cunnilingus). The tongue may also penetrate the anus during anilingus, which is a form of oral and anal sex. If one or more fingers are used to penetrate an orifice, it is called fingering or digital penetration. The insertion of an object, such as a dildo, vibrator or other sex toy, into a person's genital area or anus may also be considered sexual penetration.

Unlawful

Penetrative sex crimes are generally considered more serious than non-penetrative sex crimes, and sexual penetration of a child even more so. A child below the statutory age of consent cannot consent to acts involving sexual penetration. In laws, the term sexual penetration is commonly used in relation to sex with children. Unlawful sexual penetration is generally an offense irrespective of how deep the penetration was and irrespective of whether ejaculation of semen took place.

Laws may distinguish particular forms of sexual penetration as part of the offense. For example, the law in the U.S. state of Oregon provides:

In the United Kingdom, sexually penetrating a relative is an offense.

Various forms of penetration have at times been considered obscene and been prohibited. Works containing such penetrations may be considered pornography.

See also 

 Sex and the law

References

Sexual acts